Akseli is a Finnish given name. Notable people with the name include:

 Akseli Anttila (1897–1953), Finnish-born Soviet major general of the Red Army
 Akseli Brander (1876–1958), Finnish agronomist, educationist, farmer and politician
 Akseli Gallen-Kallela (1865–1931), Swedish-speaking Finnish painter
 Akseli Hirn (1845–1906), Finnish minister
 Akseli Kokkonen (born  1984), Norwegian ski jumper
 Akseli Lankinen (born 1997), Finnish volleyball player
 Akseli Pelvas (born 1989), Finnish footballer

See also
 Akseli and Elina (Finnish: Akseli ja Elina), 1970 Finnish drama film

Finnish masculine given names